Tornado Alley is a collection of short stories and one poem by Beat Generation author William S. Burroughs, written during the later years of his career and first published in 1989. The first edition of the book included illustrations by S. Clay Wilson.

Notable pieces in the collection include the poem "Thanksgiving Day, Nov. 28, 1986" and the crime melodrama "Where He Was Going", both of which are read by Burroughs on his album Dead City Radio. According to Burroughs in his spoken introduction to "Where He Was Going" on the album, the latter was inspired by Ernest Hemingway's "The Snows of Kilimanjaro" with the title a quotation from the earlier story. A music video for "Thanksgiving Day" was also produced to promote its inclusion on the album.

The collection is dedicated to John Dillinger, "in hope that he is still alive". Burroughs recites this dedication at the start of his Dead City Radio recording of the "Thanksgiving Day" poem, retitled "A Thanksgiving Prayer" for the album.

Contents

Thanksgiving Day, Nov. 28, 1986 (poem)
Jerry and the Stockbroker
To Talk for Joe the Dead
Dead-End Reeking Street
The FUs
Book of Shadows
Where He Was Going

1989 short story collections
Short story collections by William S. Burroughs